The 2011–12 North of Scotland Cup began on 23 July 2011 and ended on 11 September 2011.

This season saw Nutel Communications as the sponsors for the second year with draw taking place at their headquarters in Inverness.  The draw, like previous years, was split into north and south sections but without Ross County and Elgin City who withdrew from the competition.

2011-12 Competing Clubs
Brora Rangers
Clachnacuddin
Forres Mechanics
Fort William
Golspie Sutherland
Halkirk United
Inverness Caledonian Thistle
Lossiemouth
Nairn County
Rothes
Strathspey Thistle
Thurso
Wick Academy

First round
North Section
Thurso 1-4 Brora Rangers
Wick Academy 1-2 Halkirk United
Golspie Sutherland 1-2 Clachnacuddin

South Section
Lossiemouth 1-1 Rothes AET Rothes won 4-2 on penalties
Fort William 3-4 Forres Mechanics
Bye: Strathspey Thistle, Inverness Caledonian Thistle, Nairn County

Second round
North Section
Halkirk United 1-1 Clachnacuddin AET Halkirk won 3-2 on penalties (at Harmsworth Park, Wick)
Brora Rangers 3-5 Inverness Caledonian Thistle

South Section
Rothes 1-2 Forres Mechanics
Nairn County 3-1 Strathspey Thistle

Semi finals
North Section
Inverness Caledonian Thistle 1-0 Halkirk United (at Harmsworth Park, Wick)
South Section
Forres Mechanics 2-0 Nairn County

Final
Inverness Caledonian Thistle 4-3 Forres Mechanics (at Mosset Park, Forres)

References

North of Scotland Cup seasons
North of Scotland Cup